Kubu may refer to:

 Contraction for Jüdischer Kulturbund
 Kubu people, indigenous people in central Sumatra, Indonesia
 Kubu Raya Regency, regency in West Kalimantan, Borneo
 , a former sultanate in West Kalimantan, Borneo
 Kubu, Bali, a subdistrict in Karangasem Regency
 Kubu, Riau, a subdistrict in Rokan Hilir Regency
 Kubu, West Kalimantan, a subdistrict in Kubu Raya Regency
 Kubu Island, an island in Botswana
 Kubu Kubu (died c. 1954), general in the Mau Mau uprising
 Kubu, a Kirrule-type ferry, and the last operating steam powered Sydney Ferry, retired 1959. 
 KUBU-LP, a low-power radio station (96.5 FM) licensed to serve Sacramento, California, United States
Kubu, an alternate name for djenging, large houseboats of the Sama-Bajau people of the Philippines